Round Mountain is an eroded volcanic outcrop in the Garibaldi Volcanic Belt in British Columbia, Canada, located 8 km southwest of Eanastick Meadows,  east of Brackendale and  south of Mount Garibaldi. It is the highpoint of Paul Ridge and is located in the southwest corner of Garibaldi Provincial Park. Round Mountain formed as a result of subduction of the Juan de Fuca Plate beneath the North American Plate, known as the Cascadia subduction zone. Round Mountain last erupted during the Pleistocene.

See also
 Cascade Volcanoes
 Garibaldi Volcanic Belt
 List of volcanoes in Canada
 Volcanism of Canada
 Volcanism of Western Canada

External links
 Catalogue of Canadian volcanoes
 Canadian Mountain Encyclopedia

Subduction volcanoes
Pleistocene volcanoes
Volcanoes of British Columbia
One-thousanders of British Columbia
Garibaldi Lake volcanic field